André Sødlund (born 22 January 1996 i Växjö) is a Norwegian footballer. Sødlund, who is a midfielder, plays for Sandefjord in Eliteserien. Sødlund arrived at Sandefjord ahead of the 2014 season after an unsuccessful spell at the Bolton Wanderers Academy. He has also played games for both the Norway U18 and U19 sides.

Honours

Sandefjord 
 Norwegian First Division: 2014

References

External links 
 «Andre Sødlund», profile on altomfotball.no 
 «Andre Sødlund», profil on the homepage of NFF 
 

1996 births
Norwegian footballers
Norwegian expatriates in England
Sandefjord Fotball players
Living people
Association football midfielders
Nest-Sotra Fotball players
Odds BK players
Sandnes Ulf players
Eliteserien players
Norwegian First Division players